Paula Julander (born January 21, 1939) is an American politician who served in the Utah House of Representatives from the 24th district from 1989 to 1993 and in the Utah State Senate from 1999 to 2005.

References

1939 births
Living people
Democratic Party members of the Utah House of Representatives
Democratic Party Utah state senators